Sparkling may refer to:

Beverages
 Sparkling apple cider
 Sparkling water
 Sparkling wine

Biology
 Sparkling enope squid, a squid species
 Sparkling gourami, a fish species
 Sparkling violetear, a hummingbird species

See also
 Spark (disambiguation)
 Sparkle (disambiguation)